The Mayor of the West of England is the directly elected mayor who leads the West of England Combined Authority. The body, a combined authority, is responsible for the strategic administration of the West of England, including planning, transport and skills. For this purpose the West of England is defined as the local authority areas of Bristol, South Gloucestershire, and Bath and North East Somerset. The creation of the role was agreed in 2016 as part of a devolution deal, by the then Chancellor George Osborne and the leaders of the three councils.

Elections use the supplementary vote system, where electors can vote for "first preference" and "second preference" candidates. If no candidate receives a majority of first-choice votes, all but the two leading candidates are eliminated and the votes of those eliminated are redistributed according to their second-choice votes to determine the winner.

The first election took place on 4 May 2017, and was won by Tim Bowles with a total of 70,300 votes, including second preferences. The turnout was 29.7%, with 199,519 voting out of the possible 671,280.

List of mayors

Timeline

Elections

2021

2017

Turnout in the election was: 29.3%

See also
Mayor of Bath
Mayor of Bristol
History of local government in Bristol § Mayors

References

External links
 West of England Combined Authority

West of England
Local government in Bristol
Politics of Bristol
Politics of Bath and North East Somerset
Politics of South Gloucestershire District